The communauté de communes Cœur du Var groups 11 communes of the Var département, in southeastern France. Its seat is in Le Luc. Its area is 448.2 km2, and its population was 43,518 in 2018.

Composition
The communauté de communes consists of the following 11 communes:

Besse-sur-Issole
Cabasse 
Le Cannet-des-Maures 
Carnoules 
Flassans-sur-Issole 
Gonfaron 
Le Luc 
Les Mayons 
Pignans 
Puget-Ville 
Le Thoronet

History

It was created in January 2002 and replaced the SIVOM of Centre Var.

References

External links
 Official website

Intercommunalities of Var
Commune communities in France